Adam Nyerere Bahner (born May 21, 1982), better known by the pseudonym Tay Zonday or as "Chocolate Rain Guy", is an American YouTube personality, singer-songwriter, and voice actor. He is known for his bass singing voice.

Zonday garnered mainstream exposure when his song "Chocolate Rain" became a viral video in July 2007. As of December 2022, "Chocolate Rain" has over 134 million views on YouTube.

Early life
Zonday was born Adam Nyerere Bahner in Minneapolis, Minnesota to an African-American mother and a Caucasian father. He is the youngest of three children, and his parents were both teachers. He attended the Illinois Mathematics and Science Academy but dropped out before graduating. Zonday graduated from The Evergreen State College in 2004.

Zonday enrolled in the University of Minnesota American studies PhD program in 2004, studying the history of theater and social change, with the intention of becoming a professor. After the viral success of "Chocolate Rain", he left university with a master's degree in 2008 and moved to Los Angeles, California. He used a stage name because he wanted a separation between his academic and entertainment career. Bahner chose "Tay Zonday" because he thought it was catchy and nobody had claimed the name yet, according to a Google search.

Career
While a PhD student in Minneapolis, Minnesota, Zonday began performing at open mic nights in 2006. Looking for more feedback, he began uploading his performances online the next year.

Zonday released "Chocolate Rain", a viral song on race and race politics, on April 22, 2007. He was soon making appearances on national television. He appeared on the Opie & Anthony Show, G4TV's Attack of the Show!, VH1's Best Week Ever, Lily Allen and Friends, Jimmy Kimmel Live!, Tosh.0 and Maury where he performed "Chocolate Rain" on national television a little over three months after he posted his composition on YouTube. He made the front page of Sunday's Los Angeles Times on August 12, 2007, with additional features in The Toronto Star, The Chicago Tribune's RedEye, The Star Tribune and People and has appeared on CNN for a televised interview. On February 12, 2008, he appeared on the television show Lily Allen and Friends on BBC Three, and performed a cover of Lily Allen's debut "Smile". In March 2008, the video won a YouTube award in the category "Music".

The Australian Daily Telegraph newspaper wrote: "Tay Zonday has written perhaps the most listened-to song in the world right now". People said: "He's scored a YouTube hit with his repetitive, keyboard-driven 'Chocolate Rain', and after a recent appearance on Jimmy Kimmel Live, Tay Zonday's star is shining even brighter". The article also noted that celebrity musicians paid tribute to the song as its popularity rapidly peaked in August 2007. John Mayer reportedly copied Zonday's keyboard riff with his guitar in concert, along with appearing on Best Week Ever improvising a parody to the tune of Nelly Furtado's "Say It Right". Green Day drummer Tré Cool recorded a parody of "Chocolate Rain" which he posted on YouTube. Zonday also became the subject of thousands of other parodies and remixes on YouTube. A clip of his video was also shown on The CW's short-lived series, Online Nation. Zonday has also been interviewed twice on Good Morning America, in March and November 2008.

Zonday starred in a commercial for Comedy Central's "Last Laugh 07", hosted by Lewis Black. He released a video called "Cherry Chocolate Rain", in a promotion with Dr Pepper. He starred alongside Leslie Hall in a commercial for Firefox web browser singing a song called "Users Against Boredom" in a parody of "We Are the World". Zonday has said that his voice is often compared to Paul Robeson, Barry White, James Earl Jones, and Brad Roberts of the Crash Test Dummies. He appeared in-person at Intel's Consumer Electronics Show booth, rendering the source files of the "Chocolate Rain" YouTube video in Sony Vegas.

The Grammy Award-winning music video for rock band Weezer's single "Pork and Beans" featured Zonday, along with other YouTube celebrities. As well, in May 2008, Zonday performed an acoustic version of the song with Brian Bell of Weezer, spoofing his own performance in "Chocolate Rain".

Zonday was featured on the Jace Hall Show, where he was comically interviewed at a famous Hollywood restaurant in a play on the dissonance between Internet fame and the traditional entertainment industry.

In February 2010, he cameoed in a Vizio Super Bowl commercial opened by Beyoncé. In October 2010, he appeared on Comedy Central's Night of Too Many Stars autism charity event during a musical number with Steve Carell and Stephen Colbert.

In August 2011, Zonday appeared on America's Got Talent and performed 15 seconds of his song "Chocolate Rain". Zonday was also featured in Dave Days' YouTube video spoof of Justin Bieber's song "Baby", which has over 16 million views. He had a cameo in The Guild season 5 episode 3 "Megagame-o-ramacon!", which aired on August 9, 2011. In November he uploaded "Mama Economy (The Economy Explained)" in response to an economic crisis in the United States. "Mama Economy" features Lindsey Stirling playing the violin.

On June 22, 2012, Zonday uploaded a cover of Carly Rae Jepsen's number one single "Call Me Maybe", which as of 2022 has reached over 6.7 million views. It was featured on "The 10 Best 'Call Me Maybe' Covers" on Billboard.com. He is seen performing the single in front of a microphone in what he claimed to be "as low as I could [sing]".

In 2015, Zonday co-starred in the sitcom The Jack and Triumph Show on Adult Swim.

In 2016, he appeared in the films Internet Famous and Laid in America.

In 2017, he appeared on Steve Harvey to celebrate the tenth anniversary of "Chocolate Rain".

Voice acting 
As a voice actor, he voiced part of a multimedia presentation built to celebrate 50 years of NASA history.

He also voiced a Count Chocula-inspired parody of himself in Adult Swim's Robot Chicken, in the 16th episode of the fourth season, "The Ramblings of Maurice." In the sketch, Zonday performs a spoof of his viral hit "Chocolate Rain", entitled "Chocolate Grain".

Zonday voiced "The King" in the Happy Wheels animated series based on the video game of the same name, which premiered on Go90 in November 2016.

In July 2017, Machinima, Inc. and Hasbro cast several YouTube personalities, including Zonday, for the animated series Transformers: Titans Return on Go90 to garner online attention. Zonday was cast as "Chorus of the Primes".

Zonday voiced the character “Surge” in the YouTube movie Mega64 Version 4.1 Revengurrection which premiered on YouTube in December 2021.

Personal life
Zonday has stated that he had been diagnosed with Asperger syndrome as a teenager, resumed psychiatric care at age 37, and has been re-diagnosed with autism spectrum disorder. In April 2021, he stated that he has debilitating hyperacusis.

See also
List of YouTubers

References

External links

 
 

1982 births
African-American male singer-songwriters
American basses
American male comedians
21st-century American comedians
American Internet celebrities
American male voice actors
Living people
Male actors from Minneapolis
Midwest hip hop musicians
Musicians from Minneapolis
Singer-songwriters from Minnesota
Evergreen State College alumni
University of Minnesota College of Liberal Arts alumni
Outsider musicians
Actors with autism
21st-century African-American male singers
American YouTubers